Hemmatabad (also Romanized as Hemmatābād; also known as Himmatābād) is a village in Howmeh Rural District, in the Central District of Mahvelat County, Razavi Khorasan Province, Iran. At the 2006 census, its population was 1,484, in 316 families.

References 

Populated places in Mahvelat County